A building estimator or cost estimator is an individual that quantifies the materials, labor, and equipment needed to complete a construction project.  Building cost estimating can concern diverse forms of construction from residential properties to hi-rise and civil works.   
Both estimators and quantity surveyors must have a background education in the construction industry. 
Representative professional bodies which regulate property professionals:
 Entry to membership of the Royal Institution of Chartered Surveyors (United Kingdom) is via four main routes: academic, graduate, technical, and senior professional and has links with a number of universities worldwide, with whom they have accredited approved courses.
The American Society of Professional Estimators - a non profit association which promotes construction estimating as a professional field of endeavor. Professional estimators use Construction Estimating Software.
The Consulting Estimator Forum is a non profit group which promotes professional construction bidding and estimating practices. Professional estimators use Construction Estimating Software.

See also
AACE International
Construction Estimating Software
Cost engineering

References

External links
ASPE National
The Building Estimator's Reference Book 
The Building Estimator's Guide

Construction and extraction occupations
Real estate valuation